James Donald McFarlane (born June 10, 1931) is a former Canadian sprinter.

Life

He attended McMaster University where he won the 100 and 220 yard races in all four years. McFarlane established a new record of 9.9 seconds in the 100 yd. sprint during the Senior Intercollegiate Championship in 1951. He also competed as a member of the Hamilton Olympic Club and won several junior and senior Canadian Championships.

Highlights

1948 M.M. Robinson Athletic Scholarship Medal Awarded to BCHS Athlete of Year
1951 Hec Philips Memorial Trophy – Awarded to the Most Outstanding Performance in the Senior Intercollegiate Track and Field Championships
1952 and 1954 Awarded the Trophy as the Most Outstanding Athlete in the Hamilton Olympic Club
1954 Silver Medal – 100 yard Sprint – British Empire Games – Vancouver, BC
1954 Gold Medal – 4X100 yard Relay – British Empire Games – Vancouver, BC
1974 Awarded a Provincial Sport Citation by the Province of Ontario
1991 Inducted into the McMaster University Sports Hall of Fame
2011 Inducted into the Burlington Sports Hall of Fame

References

 Sports Reference

1931 births
Athletes from Toronto
Canadian male sprinters
Athletes (track and field) at the 1952 Summer Olympics
Athletes (track and field) at the 1954 British Empire and Commonwealth Games
Olympic track and field athletes of Canada
Commonwealth Games gold medallists for Canada
Commonwealth Games silver medallists for Canada
Commonwealth Games medallists in athletics
Living people
McMaster University alumni
Medallists at the 1954 British Empire and Commonwealth Games